Qeshlaq-e Hajj Soleyman Akbar Keramati (also Romanized as Qeshlāq-e Ḩājj Soleymān Akbar Kerāmatī; also known as Qeshlāq-e Soleymān Akbar) is a village in Qeshlaq-e Sharqi Rural District, Qeshlaq Dasht District, Bileh Savar County, Ardabil Province, Iran. At the 2006 census, its population was 33, in 6 families.

References 

Towns and villages in Bileh Savar County